Bhupatinagar is a village, in Bhagabanpur II CD block in Contai subdivision of Purba Medinipur district in the state of West Bengal, India.

Geography

Police station
Bhupatinagar police station has jurisdiction over Bhagabanpur II CD block. It covers an area of 179.23 km2 with a population of  14,258.

CD block HQ
The headquarters of Bhagabanpur II CD block are located at Bhupatinagar.

Urbanisation
93.55% of the population of Contai subdivision live in the rural areas. Only 6.45% of the population live in the urban areas and it is considerably behind Haldia subdivision in urbanization, where 20.81% of the population live in urban areas.

Note: The map alongside presents some of the notable locations in the subdivision. All places marked in the map are linked in the larger full screen map.

Demographics
As per 2011 Census of India Bhupatinagar had a total population of 5,149 of which 2,661 (52%) were males and 2,488 (48%) were females. Population below 6 years was 468. The total number of literates in Bhupatinagar was 4,413 (94.27% of the population over 6 years).

Transport
Lalat-Janka Road passes through Bhupatinagar.

Education
Mugberia Gangadhar Mahavidyalaya was established in 1964. It is affiliated to Vidyasagar University and offers courses in arts, science and commerce. It also offers degree and post-graduate courses in physical education. The college is named after Raisaheb Gangadhar Nanda.

Healthcare
Bhupatinagar Mugberia Rural Hospital at Bhupatinagar (with 30 beds) is the main medical facility in Bhagabanpur II CD block. There are primary health centres at Barberia (with 10 beds) and Simulia (with 6 beds).

References

Villages in Purba Medinipur district